Rudraksh is a 2004 Indian Hindi-language science fiction action film directed by Mani Shankar. cinematography by T. Surendra Reddy starring Suniel Shetty, Sanjay Dutt, Bipasha Basu, Isha Koppikar and Kabir Bedi. The film has many references to epic poem Ramayana ("The Path of Rāma"). The film released on 13 February 2004 to a negative response by critics and was declared a disaster at the box office.

Plot
Dr. Gayatri (Bipasha Basu) is an Indian American paranormal researcher at University of California, researching esoteric practices such as voodoo, spirit possession, magic and healing powers. She seeks the hidden knowledge that goes into such practices, the knowledge that cannot be explained by science or logic.

Her search for answers brings her and her team of scientists to India. She comes across Varun (Sanjay Dutt), a man who is gifted with special intuitive and healing powers which he claims to have developed through meditation. He is a blend of Indian philosophy and modern culture, a master at martial arts and a devotee of Hanuman. He worships and trains by day, while working as a bouncer at a club  by night. Gayatri is immediately impressed by Varun's powers to take away pain and disease from people and cure them. He becomes the subject of her study.

After a few experiments by Gayatri, Varun has an insight about the existence of a dark power that is hidden. He explains that the force is linked to Ravana's Rudraksh, which is hidden away from the world. This is not a normal Rudraksh - it carries in its seed the powers that can transmute humans into new species. The bearer of this Rudraksh will have supernatural powers beyond imagination. In the language of science, it is a 'multi-dimensional hologram' in the form of a seed.
Meanwhile, Bhuria (Suniel Shetty) mentally communicates with Varun, so they can share their abilities since neither of them can utilize the full power of the Rudraksha alone. Varun refuses, but Bhuria continues his attempts to join their powers and manipulate Varun.

Gayatri finds about a set of strange words which cause changes in people when spoken. She tests the effects of those sounds on a rat, and notices strange mutations and changes in the functioning of the rat's body. Suzy, Gayatri's research assistant, hears those sounds directly, becomes possessed and starts working for Bhuria. Suzy tries to kill Gayatri, but Varun over powers her and saves Gayatri, after which Suzy dies while trying to escape.

Varun and Gayatri thus set out to discover this Rudraksh, the reality of Bhuria and also find certain answers for Varun's own self. Their perilous journey leaves through the most rugged terrains of the Himalayas to the mysterious ruins of the legendary King Ravana's palaces in Yala, Sri Lanka.

He thus finds how Bhuria, a poor but wild and arrogant labor contractor in the excavation team of the Rudraksha, transformed into a powerful Rakshasha & possessor of supernatural powers, that the words spoken by the madman were actually an ancient verse, a Rakshasha mantra, and that the real aim of Bhuria is to use the Rudraksha and Rakshasha mantra for spreading evil and hatred in the world, thus effectively restoring the rule of rakshashas once more.

It thus, once more becomes a battle of good vs. evil, where either must overcome the other. End of the day, the fear maker monsters are always unliked.

Cast 
Sanjay Dutt as Varun Deshmukh   
Suniel Shetty as Bhuria Kapoor
Isha Koppikar as Lalli, Bhuria's girlfriend and a contract killer.
Bipasha Basu as Dr. Gayatri Singh
Kabir Bedi as Pandit Ved Bhushan, a saint and Varun's father.
Farhad Shahnawaz as in Supporting Role
Vinay Varma as Mantrik
 Agnes Darenius as Suzy, Dr. Gayatri's research assistant
Negar Khan
Virendra Saxena as security guard

Reception
Critical response 

Rudraksh opened to a negative reception by critics. Taran Adarsh of Bollywood Hungama rated the film 1.5/5, stating,"Rudraksh rests on Sanjay Dutt and Suniel Shetty's shoulders and both enact their parts with utmost sincerity. Dutt seems to be enjoying his work and it shows on screen. Shetty too is up to the mark. The get-ups of both Dutt and Shetty would also be appreciated. Bipasha Basu does an okay job, while Isha Koppikar leaves an impression in a negative role. Kabir Bedi is alright. Nigar Khan sizzles in the dance track. On the whole, Rudraksh proves the adage 'All that glitters is not gold' absolutely right. The film has gloss, no soul, which will take a toll on its overall business." On the critical aggregator website Rotten Tomatoes, the film has a rating of 38%, and a rating of 2.7/10 by IMDb. The film stands among the lowest rated Bollywood films of all time.

Box Office

Rudraksh had a fairly decent opening day, collecting ₹1.10 crore on its first day, followed by ₹1.17 crore on its second day and ₹1.30 crore on its third day, taking its opening weekend collection to ₹3.57 crore.

The film collected a total of ₹5.12 crore in its opening week, and ended up with a domestic lifetime collection of ₹5.97 crore, and was declared a as a "Disaster" by Box Office India.

Soundtrack

See also
 Science fiction film of India

References

External links
 Review at scifilm.org includes an explanation of the word "rudraksh."
 

2004 science fiction action films
Indian science fiction action films
2000s Hindi-language films
2004 films
Films scored by Vishal–Shekhar
Films scored by Shankar–Ehsaan–Loy
Films based on the Ramayana
Hindu mythology in popular culture
Indian science fiction films
Films directed by Mani Shankar